71st National Board of Review Awards
December 7, 1999

Best Picture: 
 American Beauty 
The 71st National Board of Review Awards, honoring the best in filmmaking in 1999, were announced on 7 December 1999 and given on 18 January 2000.

Top 10 films
American Beauty
The Talented Mr. Ripley
Magnolia
The Insider
The Straight Story
Cradle Will Rock
Boys Don't Cry
Being John Malkovich
Tumbleweeds
Three Kings

Top Foreign Films
All About My Mother
Run Lola Run
East/West
Cabaret Balkan
The Emperor and the Assassin

Winners
Best Picture: 
American Beauty
Best Foreign Film:
All About My Mother
Best Actor:
Russell Crowe - The Insider
Best Actress:
Janet McTeer - Tumbleweeds
Best Supporting Actor:
Philip Seymour Hoffman - Magnolia, The Talented Mr. Ripley
Best Supporting Actress:
Julianne Moore - Magnolia, A Map of the World, An Ideal Husband
Best Acting by an Ensemble:
Magnolia
Breakthrough Performance - Male:
Wes Bentley - American Beauty
Breakthrough Performance - Female:
Hilary Swank - Boys Don't Cry
Best Director:
Anthony Minghella - The Talented Mr. Ripley
Outstanding Directorial Debut:
Kimberly Peirce - Boys Don't Cry
Best Screenplay:
John Irving - The Cider House Rules
Arthur Laurents - Career Achievement
Best Documentary:
Buena Vista Social Club
Best Film made for Cable TV
A Lesson Before Dying
Career Achievement Award:
Clint Eastwood
Billy Wilder Award for Excellence in Directing:
John Frankenheimer
Special Filmmaking Achievement:
Tim Robbins - Cradle Will Rock
William K. Everson Award for Film History:
Jeanine Basinger, Silent Stars
International Freedom Award:
Joan Chen - Xiu Xiu: The Sent Down Girl
Freedom of Expression:
Michael Mann - The Insider
Special Citation:
Barry Levinson - Outstanding Cinematic Series, The Baltimore Series
Special Recognition for Excellence in Filmmaking:
A Map of the World
A Walk on the Moon
Election
Go
Limbo
Lock, Stock and Two Smoking Barrels
Man of the Century
Stir of Echoes
This Is My Father
Twin Falls Idaho

External links
National Board of Review of Motion Pictures :: Awards for 1999

1999
1999 film awards
1999 in American cinema